Vaccarini is an Italian surname. Notable people with the surname include:

  (1914–2002), Italian sculptor, painter, and scenographer
 Giovanni Battista Vaccarini (1702–1768), Italian architect
 Giuseppe Vaccarini (born 1952), Italian sommelier

Italian-language surnames